Burak Efe Yaz (born 18 August 2003) is a Turkish footballer who plays as a attacking midfielder for TFF Third League club Malatya Arguvan SK on loan from Yeni Malatyaspor.

Career
Yaz is a youth product of Yeni Malatyaspor, and signed his first professional contract with them in 2020 for 3 years. He made his professional debut with them in a 3–0 Süper Lig loss to Kayserispor on 14 May 2022.

References

External links
 
 

2003 births
Sportspeople from Malatya
Living people
Turkish footballers
Association football midfielders
Yeni Malatyaspor footballers
Süper Lig players
TFF Third League players